General Bhimsen Thapa Ra Tatkalin Nepal is a historical book by Chittaranjan Nepali. It is a biography of the first prime minister of modern Nepal, Bhimsen Thapa. It was published in 1956 (2013 BS) and won the first-ever Madan Puraskar.

Background 
The book was funded by Nepal Sanskritik Sangh (Nepal Cultural Association), a governmental body. Nepali was already established as a poet before publishing the book. Nepali was 26 years old when he completed the book.

Synopsis 
Bhimsen Thapa was born on August 1775 in Gorkha district of Nepal to Amar Singh Thapa and Satyarupa Maya. He was taken to Kathmandu where he rose to the rank of Kaji. He played a key part in the expansion of Nepalese kingdom and during the Anglo-Nepalese War. He was imprisoned during the later part of his life and died of a suicide in 1839.

Reception 
The book won the first ever Madan Puraskar along with Hamro Lok Sanskriti by Satya Mohan Joshi and Adhikbibhav Sthirbidhoot Utpadhak by Bala Ram Joshi in 1956 (2013 BS).

See also 

 Hamro Lok Sanskriti
 Karnali Lok Sanskriti
 Mahakavi Devkota

References 

Nepalese non-fiction books
20th-century Nepalese books
Nepalese biographies
1956 non-fiction books
Madan Puraskar-winning works
Cultural depictions of Bhimsen Thapa
Nepali-language books